Mellinus is a genus of wasps in the family  Crabronidae. The species are found in the Palearctic, Nearctic, the Neotropics and the Orient. 16 species are known

Species (Europe)
Mellinus arvensis (Linnaeus, 1758)
Mellinus crabroneus (Thunberg, 1791)

Species (worldwide)
These 16 species belong to the genus Mellinus:

 Mellinus abdominalis Cresson, 1882 i c g
 Mellinus alpestris Cameron, 1890 i c g
 Mellinus andinus Menke, 1996 i c g
 Mellinus arvensis (Linnaeus, 1758) i c g
 Mellinus bimaculatus Packard, 1867 i c g b
 Mellinus costaricae (R. Bohart, 2000) i c g
 Mellinus crabroneus (Thunberg, 1791) i c g
 Mellinus globulosus (Fourcroy, 1785) i c g
 Mellinus hansoni Menke, 1996 i c g
 Mellinus iani Menke, 1996 i c g
 Mellinus imperialis R. Bohart, 1968 i c g b
 Mellinus obscurus Handlirsch, 1888 i c g
 Mellinus orientalis S. Gupta, Gayubo and Pulawski, 2008 i c g
 Mellinus pygmaeus Handlirsch, 1888 i c g
 Mellinus rufinodus Cresson, 1865 i c g b
 Mellinus satanicus Siri and R. Bohart, 1974 i c g

Data sources: i = ITIS, c = Catalogue of Life, g = GBIF, b = Bugguide.net

References

External links

Mellinus images at  Consortium for the Barcode of Life
 Catalog of Sphecidae California Academy of Sciences Institute of Biodiversity

Crabronidae